Mirna Bzdigian is an Armenian model and beauty pageant titleholder who was crowned Miss Armenia 2021.  In 2021, Mirna represented  Armenia in the  Miss World 2021 pageant.

Early life and education
Mirna was born in Aleppo, Syria. She studies  a bachelor in English and Communications from American University of Armenia.

Career
Mirna started modelling in 2014. In 2020, Mirna represented Armenia at Miss Earth 2020 and currently, represented  Armenia in the  Miss World 2021  pageant at the José Miguel Agrelot Coliseum in San Juan, Puerto Rico.

References

External references
Miss World
Election of Miss Armenia 2021
Vận động viên bơi chuyên nghiệp trở thành Hoa hậu Armenia – xổ số miền bắc
Miss World 2021 bares new finals date after 23 contestants tested positive for COVID-19
Miss Mundo 2021: fecha y hora del evento en Perú, Colombia, Venezuela y Chile?
Vận động viên bơi chuyên nghiệp trở thành Hoa hậu Armenia

Living people
Year of birth missing (living people)